William Lake Provincial Park is a provincial park located in the Rural Municipality of Morton, in southwest Manitoba on Turtle Mountain. Its sister park, the much larger Turtle Mountain Provincial Park, lies to the west.

The park is centered on William Lake. It is one of two lakes in Manitoba named William Lake; the other is located in Northern Manitoba near Little Limestone Lake.

Park amenities include a campground, a beach, and hiking trails.

Turtle's Back Hiking Trail
The trail route passes through the surrounding Turtle Mountain Community Pasture. The trail climbs to the 'Turtle's Back', giving hikers views of the surrounding area.

Turtle Mountain Community Pasture

It is considered to be a Class VI protected area under the IUCN protected area management categories. Since 2016, the pasture has been managed by the Association of Manitoba Community Pastures.

See also
 Prairie Farm Rehabilitation Administration

External links
 
 Association of Manitoba Community Pastures

References

Provincial parks of Manitoba
Year of establishment missing
Protected areas of Manitoba